Koszuty may refer to the following locations in Poland:
 Koszuty, Słupca County, a village in Słupca County, Poland
 Koszuty, Środa Wielkopolska County, a village in Środa Wielkopolska County, Poland

 Koszuty Małe, a village in Słupca County, Poland
 Koszuty-Huby, a village in Środa Wielkopolska County, Poland
 Koszuty-Parcele, a village in Słupca County, Poland